Ph.D Ali A.F. AL-Furaih was a geology professor at King Saud University. Born in Bukayriyah, Saudi Arabia.

Academic qualifications
 B. Sc. in geology with grade excellent and first class of distinction, King Saud University, Riyadh, June 1971
 Ph.D. in geology, University of Leicester, England, July 1977

Academic career
 Professor of geology, King Saud University 1985–2010
 Associate professor, King Saud University 1980–1985
 Adjunct associate scientist, University of Kansas, 1982–1983
 Assistant professor, King Saud University 1977–1980

Administrative work
 Dean of graduate college, King Saud University (1995–1998)
 Member of the editorial board of Journal of Faculty of Science, King Saud University
 Chairman of Seismological-Geophysical Observatory, King Saud University (1991–1995)
 Chairman of Geology Department, Faculty of Science, King Saud University (1986–1988)
 Vice dean of Centre for University Women Students, King Saud University (1980–1983)

Membership of councils
 Member of King Saud University Council (1995–1998)
 Member of the Academic Council (1985–1992)
 Member of College of Science Council (1979–1980) and (1986–1988)
 Member of Earth Science Society Council (1988–1991)
 Member of the University Co-operative Society Council (1987–1992)
 Chairman or member of several committee at King Saud University
 Representative of King Saud University at several Saudi Arabian Organizations

List of publications
 Al-Furaih, A.A.F., (1975) – On Hornibrookella anna (Lienenkaus), A Stereo-Atlas of Ostracod Shells, vol. 2, pt. 3, p 211-214, London.
 Al-Furaih, A.A.F., (1975) – On Paragrenocythere biclavata Al-Furaih gen. et sp. nov. A Stereo-Atlas of Ostracod Shells, vol.2 pt. 4, p. 231-238, London.
 Al-Furaih, A.A.F., (1977) – Cretaceous and Palaeocene species of the Ostracod Hornibrookella from Saudi Arabia. Palaeontology, vol.20, pt.3, p. 483-502, pl. 53-58, London.
 Al-Furaih, A.A.F., (1980) – Upper Cretaceous and Lower Tertiary Ostracoda (Superfamily CYTHERACEA) from Saudi Arabia, 211 p., 65 pl., publication of University Libraries, University of Riyadh, Riyadh.
 Al-Furaih, A.A.F. and Siddiqui, Q.A., (1981) – The Ostracod Genus Ananmatocythere from the Middle Eocene of Pakistan and Saudi Arabia, Bulletin of College of Science, Riyadh Univer., vol. 12, no. 2, p. 429-441, 2 pl., 2 fig, Riyadh.
 Siddiqui, Q.A. and Al-Furaih, A.A.F., (1981) – Schizoptocythere, A distinctive New Ostracode Genus from the Early Tertiary of Western Asia, Palaeontology vol. 24, pt. 4, p. 877-890, pl. 123–126, London.
 Al-Furaih, A.A.F., (1983) – Palaeocene and Lower Eocene Ostracoda from the Ummer Radhuma Formation of Saudi Arabia. The University of Kansas Palaeontological Contributions, no. 107, 10 p., 3 pl., 1 fig., 1 table, Kansas.
 Al-Furaih, A.A.F., (1983) – Middle Cretaceous (Cenomanian) Ostracoda from the Wasia Formation of Saudi Arabia, The University of Kansas Palaeontological Contributions, no. 108, 6 p., 1 pl., 1 fig, Kansas.
 Al-Furaih, A.A.F., (1983) – A new species of Phalcocythere (Ostracoda) from the Lower Palaeocene of Saudi Arabia. Journal of College of Science, King Saud University, vol. 14, no. 1, p. 157–162, 1 pl., 1 fig, Riyadh.
 Al-Furaih, A.A.F., (1984) – Maastrichtian Ostracode from the Aruma Formation of Saudi Arabia. Revue de Micropaleontologie, vol. 27, pt. 3, p. 159–170, 1 fig., 3 pls, Paris.
 Al-Furaih, A.A.F., (1984) – Maastrichtian and Palaeocene species of the Ostracod genus Foveolebris from Saudi Arabia. Revista Espagnola de Micropaleontologia, vol. 16, no. 2, p. 161–169, 1 fig., 2 pls, Madrid.
 Al-Furaih, A.A.F., (1984) – Maastrichtian Ostracodes from Wadi al-Atj, Saudi Arabia. Arab Gulf Journal of Scientific Research, vol. 2, no. 2, p. 495-503, 1 fig., 2pls, Riyadh.
 Al-Furaih, A.A.F., (1984) – On Loxoconcha multiornata Bate&Gurney, A Stereo-Atlas of Ostracod Shells vol. 11, pt. 2, p. 99–102, London.
 Al-Furaih, A.A.F., (1984) – On Loxoconcha undulata Al-Furaih sp. nov., A Stereo-Atlas of Ostracod Shells vol. 11, pt. 2, p. 103–106, London.
 Al-Furaih, A.A.F., (1984) – On Loxoconcha amygdalanux Bate & Gurney, A Stereo-Atlas of Ostracod Shells vol. 11, pt. 2, p. 107–110, London.
 Al-Furaih, A.A.F., (1985) – The Ostracod genus Brachycythere from the UpperCretaceous of Saudi Arabia, Revista Espanola de Micropaleontologia, vol. 17, no. 1, p. 113–122, Madrid.
 Al-Furaih, A.A.F., (1986) – Kaesleria A new Ostracode genus from the Aruma Formation (Upper Cretaceous of Saudi Arabia), Journal of Paleontology, vol. 60, pt. 5, p. 701-720, 5 figs, Tulsa, Oklahoma.
 Al-Furaih, A.A.F., (1988) (ed.) – Proceedings of the Third Arab Symposium on Earthquake Seismology, publication of Geophysical-Seismological Observatory, King Saud University, Riyadh
 Al-Furaih, A.A.F., (1986) – Biostratigraphy of the Upper Cretaceous and Lower Tertiary of Saudi Arabia, 11th Intr. Sym. Ost., Melbourne, Australia.
 Al-Furaih, A.A.F., (1994) – On Carinocythereis batei, A Stereo-Atlas of Ostracod Shells, vol.21, pt.2, p. 71-74, London.

University textbooks
 Al-Furaih, A.A.F., (2000): "Principales of Micropaleontology" Published by King Saud University press, Riyadh, 544p.
 Al-Furaih, A.A.F., (2007): "Paleontological laboratory manual" Published by King Saud University press, Riyadh, 393p.

Current research
 Jurassic Ostracodes.
 Stratigraphical and Environmental Studies on Hanifa Formation (Jurassic) of Saudi Arabia.
 Recent Marine Ostracodes from the Persian Gulf and Red Sea.
 Biostratigraphical studies on Aruma Formation of Saudi Arabia.

References
 King Saud University Faculty Page
 Library of Congress

Living people
English-language writers from Saudi Arabia
King Saud University alumni
Alumni of the University of Leicester
Year of birth missing (living people)
Academic staff of King Saud University
Place of birth missing (living people)
Saudi Arabian geologists